Super Asteroids & Missile Command (also known as Super Asteroids and Super Missile Command) is an Atari Lynx video game released by Atari in 1995. It combines the classic video games Asteroids and Missile Command into a single game cartridge. It was the final game released by Atari for the Lynx handheld.

Summary
The graphics and sound are enhanced from their original incarnations. This game was only released in North America and Europe. 

Super Asteroids pits the player against a never ending supply of extraterrestrial debris and enemy UFOs trained to kill any human spacecraft. He must destroy everything while snatching power-ups. Super Missile Command has the player defend various of his space colonies from incoming missiles, satellites, and enemy fighters. Intermissions allow players to buy better missiles and defense system to bolster up his defense of his space colonies.

References

1995 video games
Atari Lynx games
Atari Lynx-only games
Multidirectional shooters
North America-exclusive video games
Video games developed in the United States